La presidentessa may refer to:
 
 La presidentessa (1952 film) 
 La presidentessa (1977 film)